Yogaraj Bhat (born 8 October 1972) is an Indian Kannada film-maker, director, screenwriter, lyricist and producer. He is most known for the 2006 film Mungaru Male. The film recorded the highest box-office collections in the history of Kannada cinema at the time of its release and the longest running film at a multiplex.

Early life
Yogaraj Bhat was born in Mandarthi, in Udupi district in Karnataka. He grew up in Tilavalli, Haveri. He was the youngest son of Ramachandra and Jayalakshmi Bhat's seven children. He lost his father to a boat mishap.

Career

Director
His film Mungaru Male collected estimated 50-75 crore,
this was his third film, created history in Southern Film Industry. The film ran for 464 days – first in any language to run for a whole year continually in a multiplex, beating the records of the biggest Hindi Film Industry records. It naturally brought him many rewards, awards and appreciations, including Nine State Film Awards (including Best Director and Best Film Award) and Four Filmfare Awards (Best Film, Best Music, Best Lyrics and Best Cinematography). The movie has been remade in all South Indian languages & Bengali. The rights for the movie to be made in Hindi has been bought by Shri. Boney Kapoor. He has also has directed Gaalipata , Manasare, Pancharangi, Paramatma, Drama, Vaastu Prakara, Dana Kayonu, Mugulu Nage and others

Lyricist 
Yogaraj Bhat has worked as lyricist in many Kannada movies Mungaru Male, Gaalipata, Junglee, Jackie, Manasaare, Pancharangi, Paramatma, Victory, Hudugaru, Drama, Kaddipudi, Bachchan, Adhyaksha, Gajakesari, Rajahuli and others.

He won Filmfare Award, Karnataka State Award for the song, 'Bombe Aadsonu' from the film Drama.

Filmography

As actor

Awards
 2013 – won Filmfare Award for Best Lyricist – Kannada for the song "Bombe Adsonu" from his own directorial film Drama.
 2013 – won the Bangalore Times Film Awards in "Best Lyricist" category for the song "Bombe Adsonu".

References

External links
 

Living people
Kannada film directors
Kannada-language lyricists
Indian male songwriters
Kannada playback singers
People from Haveri district
Mangaloreans
Filmfare Awards South winners
Musicians from Bangalore
Indian male playback singers
21st-century Indian composers
Film directors from Bangalore
21st-century Indian film directors
21st-century Indian dramatists and playwrights
Screenwriters from Bangalore
21st-century Indian male writers
21st-century Indian male singers
21st-century Indian singers
21st-century Indian screenwriters
1972 births